Sailors' Tales (1970–1972) is the seventh of the major box set releases from English progressive rock group King Crimson, released in 2017 by Discipline Global Mobile & Panegyric Records.

Recorded between the dazzling impact of In the Court of the Crimson King in 1969 and the startling reinvention of the band on 1973's Larks' Tongues in Aspic, this boxed set documents a crucial period in King Crimson's history and shows it to be brimming with innovation, experimentation, and boundary-pushing energy.

Sailors' Tales features previously unheard studio recordings along with a large selection of live material, most available for the first time, including four recently found concerts recording.

Across 21 CDs, 4 blu-ray discs and 2 DVDs (all audio content), with booklet containing sleeve-notes by Sid Smith, Jakko Jakszyk and David Singleton. Also includes memorabilia and a further downloadable concert.

Track listing

Notes

References

External links 
 
 
 

King Crimson albums
2017 albums
Discipline Global Mobile albums